The Belconnen Magpies Football Club is an Australian rules football club which competes in the AFL Canberra. They previously played in the now defunct North East Australian Football League competition.

History 
Originally known as the Turner Football Club, the club became known as Belconnen in 1970 and was admitted to the Canberra Australian National Football League in 1971. Wearing a navy blue guernsey with a white monogram, the club was known as the "Bees" from 1971 until 1979, then as the "Blues" following the ANU Blues' withdrawal from the league during 1979.

Before the 1986 season, the Belconnen club merged with the West Canberra Football Club to become the "Belconnen Magpies". The team began to wear the traditional magpie black and white stripes and in 1991 the club moved its headquarters to Kippax. In 1998 the colour teal was added to the existing black and white jumper.

The newly formed team did not taste premiership success until 2002 when they won three consecutive premierships. The club also clinched the 2009 premiership, with a six-point grand final win over Ainslie.

AFL players
The following Belconnen players have played in the AFL:
 Brett Allison (North Melbourne and Sydney Swans)
 Logan Austin (Port Adelaide and St.Kilda)
 Matthew Lokan (Collingwood)
 Don Pyke (West Coast Eagles)
 Jack Steele (GWS and St.Kilda)

Honours

Club
AFL Canberra (4): 2002, 2003, 2004, 2009

Premierships

Individual

Mulrooney Medalists 
 2019 – Beau Walker
 2017 – Beau Walker
 2016 – James Bennett
 2015 – Isaac Taylor
 2013 – James Bennett
 2012 – Shane Harris
 2005 – Jared Ilett	
 2003 – Steve Hazelman	
 2001 – Steve Mahar	
 1999 – Shane Clarke	
 1991 – Brent Smith	
 1984 – Geoff Hocking	
 1975 – Robert White

References

External links 

 

AFL Canberra clubs
1987 establishments in Australia
Australian rules football clubs established in 1987